Rhododendron micranthum (照山白) is a rhododendron species native to China and Korea, where it grows at altitudes of . Flowers are white.

References
 "Rhododendron micranthum", Turczaninow, Bull. Soc. Imp. Naturalistes Moscou. 10(7): 155. 1837.

micranthum
Taxa named by Nikolai Turczaninow